Theodoros Pallas (born in 1949), a Greek football player, was a defender for Aris Thessaloniki F.C. during the period 1966–80. He followed Dinos Kouis, on the all-time league appearances list for Aris, having 368 during his career. In 1981, Pallas played for Olympiakos where he retired after two seasons. He was also a member of the Greece national team in the 1970s having 31 appearances.

References

1949 births
Living people
Footballers from Thessaloniki
Greek footballers
Super League Greece players
Aris Thessaloniki F.C. players
Olympiacos F.C. players
Greece international footballers
Association football defenders